Rahmaniyeh-ye Zabun (also Romanized as Raḥmānīyeh-ye Zabūn) is a small village in Gharb-e Karun Rural District, in the Central District of Khorramshahr County, Khuzestan Province, Iran. At the 2006 census, its population was 28, in 6 families.

References 

Populated places in Khorramshahr County